Mkrtchyan or Mkrtchian is a surname. Notable people with the surname include:

Aghvan Mkrtchyan (born 1981), Armenian football defender
Armen Mkrtchyan (born 1973), Armenian wrestler
Arthur Mkrtchyan (born 1973), retired Armenian football defender
Artur Mkrtchyan (1959–1992), the First Chairman of Supreme Council of the Nagorno-Karabakh Republic
Hovhannes Mkrtchyan (born 1991), Armenian figure skater
Karlen Mkrtchyan (born 1988), Armenian football midfielder
Levon Mkrtchyan (born 1953), Armenian director known for documentaries
Lilit Mkrtchian (born 1982), Armenian grandmaster and four-time Armenian Women's champion
Frunzik (Mher) Mkrtchyan (1930–1993), Soviet Armenian actor, named a People's Artist of the Soviet Union in 1984
Samvel Mkrtchyan (1959–2014), Armenian translator, editor and writer
Susanna Mkrtchyan (born 1949), Armenian professor and founder of Wikimedia Armenia

See also
Makran
Mkrtich
 Ter-Mkrtychyan

Armenian-language surnames